Médée et Jason (Medea and Jason) is an opera by the French composer Joseph François Salomon, first performed at the Académie Royale de Musique (the Paris Opera) on 24 April 1713. It takes the form of a tragédie en musique in a prologue and five acts. The libretto is by Simon-Joseph Pellegrin, using the pseudonym "La Roque".

Sources
 Libretto at "Livrets baroques"
 Félix Clément and Pierre Larousse Dictionnaire des Opéras, Paris, 1881, page 447.

French-language operas
Tragédies en musique
Operas by Joseph François Salomon
Operas
1713 operas